Andrzej Pańta (also Andreas Johannes Painta, born April 10, 1954 in Bytom, Poland) is a Polish-German poet and translator of German literature.

Biography 
Painta studied Polish philology and biology at the University of Silesia in Katowice and made his debut in 1973 with poetry in the magazine Poglądy. He has published in Polish literary journals such as Arkadia, Portret, Śląsk, Kresy, Poezja, Integracja, Kultura and Nowy wyraz, Fa Style, List oceaniczny, Wyrazy, format and Fraza. He took part in the German-Polish poets steamer (Deutsch-Polnischer Poetendampfer) in 1998 and 1999, the festival Fortalicje in Zamość, the German-Polish Poetry Festival "wortlust" in Lublin 1997 and the Uniwersytet poezjii in Zielona Góra.<ref>[http://www.logopaedie-connewitz.de/agnieszka-haupe-kalka/uniwersytet-poezjii.htm University of poetry/ Zielona Góra]</ref>
He translated German writers and philosophers into Polish, among them Friedrich Hölderlin, Horst Bienek, Arthur Schopenhauer, Rose Ausländer, Jakob Böhme, Erik Blumenthal, Dieter Kalka and Alfred Georg Seidel.
Andrzej Pańta lives in Görlitz, Germany.

 Books of poetry 
 Wyspa na jeziorze, Katowice 1977
 Counter-revolution, 1989
 Pan, Synchrones Poem, 1992
 Nic więcej, 1995
 Bez; ogródek, 1995
 Wieczna naiwność wróżek, 1985
 Za płotem, 1981
 Brzuchem do słońca, 1986
 Pneuma culi, 1988

 Translation 
 Friedrich Hölderlin, Fale nieba, poetry, 1991
 Horst Bienek, Czas po temu, 1987
 Horst Bienek, Stopniowe zadławianie krzyku i inne eseje, Essays, 2001
 Arthur Schopenhauer: Metafizyka miłości płciowej, 1985
 Rose Ausländer: W kotle czarownic, 1995
 Jakob Böhme: O nowych, powtórnych narodzinach, 1993
 Jakob Böhme: Aurora, Letters, Zgorzelec 1999
 Jacob Böhme, Teozoficzne okólniki, Zgorzelec 2005
 Erik Blumenthal, Uwierzyć w samego siebie. Samozaufanie płynące z głębi/ An sich selber Glauben. Selbstvertrauen aus der Tiefe, Gdańsk 1998
 E. Blumenthal: Uwierzyć w samego siebie, Gdańsk 1998
 Dieter Kalka: Podwójne i potrójne, Bydgoszcz 1999Textauszug
 Alfred Georg Seidel, Niebo nad granicami, Gliwice 2001

 Prizes 
 Kryształowy Lew. Kłodzka Wiosna Poetycka 1974
 Nagrod "Pegaza" - za przekład poezji/ Pegasus Prize for translation of poetry (1992)
 Laureat nagrody im. Tadeusza Peipera
 Nagroda Czerwonej Róży w Gdańsku, 1990 
 Stypendium, Fundacja Pomocy Niezależnej Nauce i Literaturze Polskiej/ Scholarship, Foundation for Independent Polish Science and Literature, Paris 1991 
 Preis der Künstlergilde Esslingen 2000, German Prize of the "Künstlergilde"

 Bibliography 
 Jerzy Pluta: Życie na białym papierze. „Odra" 1978/4
 Janusz Leppek: By pióro nie spało. „Radar” 1978/6
 Andrzej K. Waśkiewicz: Debiuty poetyckie 1977. Antologia. W: „Debiuty poetyckie ’77”. Warszawa 1978
 Bolesław Niezgoda: Andrzej Pańta laureatem nagrody im. Tadeusza Peipera. „Nasze problemy” 1979/42
 Tadeusz Złotorzycki: Oryginalność i sztampa. „Nowe Książki" 1980/22
 Marek Pytasz: Kaleki alfabet Andrzeja Pańty. „Poglądy” 1981/19
 Stanisław Muc:  1983/9
 Stanisław Piskor: Nałóg poetycki. „Tak i Nie” 1984/26
 Stanisław Muc: Chorałki i rozmowy z Panem. „Radar” 1984/41
 Emil Biela: Chorałki i rozmowy. „Tygodnik Kulturalny” 1984/44
 Krzysztof Kuczkowski: Duchowy dowód osobisty. „Okolice” 1984/12-12
 Marian Kisiel: Przewrotny transcendentalizm. „Radar” 1986/20
 Maciej M. Szczawiński: Brzuchem do słońca. „Tak i Nie” 1986/36
 Tadeusz Złotorzycki: Wieczna przewrotność wróżek. „Nowe Książki” 1986/12
 Ryszard Bednarczyk: Andrzej Pańta: Wiek gladiatorów. „Tak i Nie” 1987/21
 Horst Bienek: Reise in die Kindheit. München 1988
 Jan Korpys: Wzajemności. „Regiony“ 1989/3
 Andrzej Lazarowicz: W świecie chaos i w nas. „Słowo Powszechne" 1989/131
 Andrzej Burzyński: Pars pro toto — Część za całość? „Biuletyn Związku Górnośląskiego” 1990/2
 Marian Kisiel: Poeci na Śląsku: Andrzej Pańta. „Górnośląski Diariusz Kulturalny” 1994/1-2
 Marianna Bocian: O tragedii ocalającej całego człowieka. „Opcje” 1995/1-2
 Jerzy Suchanek: Napaść wspomnień. „Gliwicki Magazyn Kulturalny”. Kwiecień 1995
 Jerzy Pluta: Eseje Horsta Bienka. „Przecinek” 2001/12
 Krzysztof Karwat: Inna twarz Bienka. „Dziennik Zachodni” 2001/170

 Interviews 
 Czerpanie z dna (Abgrundu). Z jednym z najbardziej interesujących i fascynujących poetów / Conversation with one of the most interesting and fascinating poets: With Andrzej Panta speaks Bogusław Sławomirski. „Gwarek” 1989/13.
 Raj utracony. Edward Szopa: Talk with Andrzej Pańta. „Życie” (Bytom). 1992/23.
 Dialektyka kosmosu. With Andrzej Pańta speaks Józef Górdziałek. "Opcje" 1995/1-2.
 Język, w jakim piszę i jaki mnie pisze. Jerzy Pluta: Talk with Andrzej Pańta, poet and translator, in „Przecinek” 2001/11.
 Prawo i bezprawie.'' With Andrzej Pańta speaks Bożena Budzińska

External links 
 Bibliography 1
 Bibliography 2

References 

Polish poets
Polish translators
People from Görlitz
People from Bytom
Living people
1954 births
Polish male poets